Grover Cleveland, the 22nd and 24th President of the United States, ran for president thrice:

 Grover Cleveland presidential campaign, 1884, the successful campaign Grover Cleveland conducted in 1884
 Grover Cleveland presidential campaign, 1888
 Grover Cleveland presidential campaign, 1892